Podagrica malvae is a species of skeletonising leaf beetles belonging to the family Chrysomelidae, subfamily Galerucinae.

This leaf beetle lives in Southern and Central Europe, in the eastern Palearctic realm, in the Near East, and in the North Africa.

The colours of the elytra of this beetle are dark blue, while pronotum, head and legs are reddish.

They feed on various Malvaceae species.

External links
 Biolib
 Culex.biol.uni.wroc.pl
 Fauna Europaea

Galerucinae
Beetles of Europe
Beetles described in 1807